Gymnostena holosericea is a species of beetle in the family Mordellidae, the only species in the genus Gymnostena.

References

Mordellidae